Nossa Senhora da Conceição (Portuguese, 'Our Lady of (Immaculate) Conception') may refer to:

Places and churches

Angola
 Church of Nossa Senhora da Conceição da Muxima, a church in Muxima District, Bengo Province
 Igreja de Nossa Senhora da Conceição (Luanda), a church in Luanda

Brazil
 Our Lady of the Conception Cathedral, Aracaju, the cathedral see of the Roman Catholic Archdiocese of Aracaju, Sergipe
 Metropolitan Cathedral of Our Lady of the Conception, Manaus (a Catholic cathedral in the city of Manaus, Amazonas
 Basílica Nossa Senhora da Conceição da Praia, a church in Salvador, Bahia

Cape Verde
 Nossa Senhora da Conceição church (Boa Vista), a church in the Povoação Velha village
 Nossa Senhora da Conceição (São Filipe), a parish in the municipality of São Filipe

India
 Our Lady of the Immaculate Conception Church, Goa, in Panaji, Goa

Portugal
 Alandroal (Nossa Senhora da Conceição), a parish in Alandroal
 Nossa Senhora da Conceição, a parish in Vila Real
 Church of Nossa Senhora da Conceição Velha, Lisbon
 Hermitage of Nossa Senhora da Conceição (Tomar), church near Tomar, Santarém District
 Igreja de Nossa Senhora da Conceição (Ermida do Paiva), Castro Daire, Viseu District
 Igreja de Nossa Senhora da Conceição, in Mafra, Portugal
 Igreja de Nossa Senhora da Conceição (Santa Maria da Feira), Santa Maria da Feira, Aveiro District
 Igreja de Nossa Senhora da Conceição do Colégio dos Jesuítas, church in Santarém

São Tomé and Principe
 Our Lady of Conception Church, São Tomé: Igreja de Nossa Senhora da Conceição, Agua Grande

Azores
 Nossa Senhora da Conceição (Angra do Heroísmo)
 Church of Nossa Senhora da Conceição (Santa Cruz das Flores), in Flores Island

Other uses
 Nossa Senhora da Conceição (1771 ship)
 Nossa Senhora da Conceição Fortress, a Portuguese fortress in Póvoa de Varzim